Brasilian Skies is the fourth studio album by Japanese jazz fusion guitarist Masayoshi Takanaka, released via Kitty Records on July 21, 1978. The album's initial release was distributed in two physical formats: a vinyl record and on a cassette tape. Stylistically, the record  unites jazz-fusion with bossa nova, samba, and progressive rock and soul.

Background
Masayoshi traveled to Brazil in 1978 to record part of the album at PolyGram's studios in Barra da Tijuca, Rio de Janeiro. The remainder of the record was recorded at Westlake Studios in Los Angeles, California.

In 2018, Masayoshi held a 40th anniversary tour of the album's release in Japan with the theme of Brasilian Skies. The five-show concert tour commenced on September 22 at the Hitomi Memorial Hall in Tokyo and ended on October 28 in Osaka. A live album recording from his performance at the Tokyo Hibiya Open-Air Concert Hall on October 13 was released on May 22, 2019.

Track listing

Personnel
Credits and personnel adapted from liner notes

 Masayoshi Takanaka – guitar, production, remixing
 Haruko Kawana – backing vocals
 Ryuichi Sakamoto – keyboard, strings
 Abraham Laboriel – bass guitar
 Getao Takahashi – bass guitar
 Scott Edwards – bass guitar
 Barrozo Netto – bass guitar
 Sergio Portillo – bass guitar
 Daudeth De Azevedo – cavaquinho
 Maria Aparecida De Souza – backing vocals
 Maria Helena Violinn – backing vocals
 Maria Rita Kfouri – backing vocals
 James Gadson – drums
 Jeff Porcaro – drums
 Shi-chan Inque – drums

 Wilson das Neves – drums
 Motoya Hamaguchi – flute
 Marlo Henderson – guitar
 Keiko Yamakawa – harp
 Greg Phillinganes – keyboard
 Kiyosumi Ishikawa – keyboard
 Sergio Carualho – keyboard
 Altamiro Coelho Rosa – percussion
 Antenor Marques Filho – percussion
 Elyeu Felico – percussion
 Hermes Coutesini – percussion
 Luna Do Pander – percussion
 Motoya Hamaguchi – percussion
 Milton Delfind Marcal – percussion
 Paulinho da Costa – percussion

Release history

References

External links

1978 albums
Masayoshi Takanaka albums